Loulle is a commune in the Jura department in region of Bourgogne-Franche-Comté in eastern France.

Population

Dinosaur Trails
In 2004 a remarkable set of well-preserved dinosaur tracks were discovered in a quarry just outside Loulle.  The tracks form a dense network of trails belonging mainly to sauropods but with other species represented.  Many of the imprints have been painted by researchers from the University of Lyon to indicate the tracks from individual animals.  The caked muddy surface over which the dinosaurs walked is also well preserved in the rock.

The site is open to the public (no admission charged) and is on a sharp bend on the main road between Loulle and Nye.

See also
Communes of the Jura department

References

Communes of Jura (department)